Adarsh Vidya Mandir Udaipurwati is a secondary school in Jhunjhunu district in the Indian state of Rajasthan.

Schools in Rajasthan
Education in Jhunjhunu district
Educational institutions established in 1990
1990 establishments in Rajasthan